Kobon (pronounced ,  or ) is a language of Papua New Guinea. It has somewhere around 90–120 verbs.

Kobon has a pandanus language, spoken when harvesting karuka.

Geographic distribution
Kobon is spoken in Madang Province and Western Highlands Province, north of Mount Hagen.

Phonology

Vowels

Only  and the diphthongs occur word-initially, apart from the quotative particle, which is variably /a~e~o~ö/.  occur syllable-initially within a word. All vowels (including the diphthongs) occur syllable-medially (in CVC syllables), syllable-finally and at the ends of words. Many vowel sequences occur, including some with identical vowels.

Consonants
Kobon distinguishes an alveolar lateral , a palatal lateral , a subapical retroflex lateral flap  ( ), and a fricative trill , though the frication on the latter is variable.

Voiced obstruents may be prenasalized after vowels, depending on the preceding consonant, and are voiceless word-initially. Liquids other than  tend toward final devoicing. ( and  do not occur in final position, while nasals and  retain voicing.)

 is sublaminal retroflex. It has been described as a lateral flap, .

All consonants occur syllable initially, though  only occurs word-initially in a single mimetic word. All consonants but  occur syllable- and word-finally. Clusters occur in many (C)VC.CV(C) words, as well as initially in a handful of mostly monosyllabic CCV(C) words.

Intervocalically, the lenis obstruents are oral  when a nasal or another lenis obstruent occurs in the preceding syllable, and are prenasalized  otherwise, with some variability after . They are often oral in a medial cluster after another consonant. Otherwise the allophones in the table above are largely in free variation.

Grammar
Kobon is a subject–object–verb language.

Singular, dual, and plural are distinguished in personal pronouns and kinship terminology.

Like the other Kalam languages, Kobon is famous for having a very small number of verbs—perhaps less than 120 for the entire language. These verbs are combined with nouns into phrases with specific meanings, much as one says "have dinner" rather than "dine" in English.

This makes for an interesting window into semantics. One might expect that with a very limited set of verbs, their meanings would be quite general as have, do, be and go are in English. To a certain extent this is really the case, as there is for example only one verb of perception. That is, the same verb is used for see, hear, taste, smell, feel (both physically and emotionally), think, and understand (compare with "I see" for "I understand" in English). Another verb is used for making sound, whether it's speaking, singing, praying, crying, twigs breaking, rocks clattering, or water gurgling. However, some Kobon verbs are quite specific. There is one exception for sound, for example: there's a specific verb for calling a pig. There are also three verbs of pouring, depending on whether the thing being poured is solid, liquid, or food; and there is even a verb that means to quarter a cassowary.

Writing system
Kobon has been written in the Latin alphabet for over 30 years. The special letters ƚ and ɫ are used for the subapical retroflex lateral flap and palatal lateral, respectively.

a b c d e g h i j k l ƚ ɫ m n ñ ŋ o ö p r s u ü w y

5–15% of Kobon speakers are literate.

References

John Davies, 1981. Kobon. Lingua Descriptive Series 3.

Languages of Madang Province
Languages of Western Highlands Province
Kalam languages
Subject–object–verb languages
Pandanus avoidance registers